WKBL (1250 AM) is a radio station broadcasting a Christian radio format. Licensed to Covington, Tennessee, United States, the station is currently owned by Charles Ennis, through licensee Grace Broadcasting Services, Inc.

On April 20, 2018, WKBL changed their format from oldies to Christian radio, branded as "Good News Radio", simulcasting WJPJ 1190 AM Humboldt.

References

External links

Tipton County, Tennessee
KBL